Allam Bello Huerta (born June 8, 1988) is a former Mexican footballer who last played as a left midfielder.

Club career

Cruz Azul
Allam Bello came to Cruz Azul in 2005 eventually making his way into the first team in 2010. He made his first division debut with Cruz Azul under coach Enrique Meza during the Apertura 2010 season against Pachuca August 14, 2010. He came in as a substitute for Alejandro Vela in the 66' minute of the match. Bello played only 8 first divisions with Cruz Azul before being loaned to Toros Neza and Lobos BUAP in 2012, for a year.

After loans with Toros Neza and Lobos BUAP Allam came back to Cruz Azul Hoping to play with the first team. Unfortunately he only played 7 league matches and did not see action for 1 season in Cruz Azul, He was eventually loaned to Irapuato FC in June 2014.

Toros  Neza
Allam Bello arrived on loan to Toros Neza for the Clausura 2012 season. He managed 7 appearances with the team.

Lobos BUAP
Allam Bello arrived from Toros Neza to Lobos BUAP for the Apertura 2012 season, on loan from Cruz Azul. He managed 9 appearances for the team. aside from playing league games with Lobos, Allam Bello played in the Apertura 2012 Copa MX with Lobos and made 4 appearances, reaching the semifinals and losing on penalties against Correcaminos.

Irapuato
Allam Bello was once again loaned to a second division team, Irapuato FC and received their iconic #11 jersey previously worn by Ariel González a club legend. He made his debut with Irapuato in the first match day of the Apertura 2014 season against Alebrijes de Oaxaca on July 19, 2014, and scored his first goal against Mérida on August 2, 2014.

References

External links

1988 births
Living people
Footballers from Hidalgo (state)
Cruz Azul footballers
Toros Neza footballers
Lobos BUAP footballers
Irapuato F.C. footballers
Atlante F.C. footballers
Alebrijes de Oaxaca players
Potros UAEM footballers
Association football midfielders
Mexican footballers